Pandit Jayateerth Mevundi (Kannada: ಜಯತೀರ್ಥ ಮೇವುಂಡಿ) is an Indian classical vocalist of the Kirana gharana (singing style).

Early life
Jayateerth was born in Hubli, Karnataka. He was brought up in a musical environment, and was encouraged by his mother Sudhabai who was fond of singing Purandara Dasa kritis.

He is an 'A Top' graded artist at All India Radio.

Discography

Hindustani classical
 Bilaskhani Todi, Abhogi Kanada and Basant, Alurkar Music House 2000
 Yaman & Marwa, Alurkar Music House 2000
 Lalit, Gunakali and Shudh Sarang, Alurkar Music House 2000
 Darbari Kanada with an additional track 'Jamuna Ke Teer' in Bhairavi, Dreams Entertainment, 2010
 'Giridhar Gopal Shyam' Vilambith and Madhyalay Bandish, 'Man ke Mandir Ayore' drut Bandish in new Rag Bhimsen - Invented, Written and Composed by Indian film and classical composer Mahesh Mahadev

Kannada devotional
 Ranga Baro Panduranga Baro - Dasara Padgalu, Ganasampada Live Cassettes
 Narayana Te Namo Namo, Ganasampada Live Cassettes 2007

Kannada film songs
 Song Mysore Desh Amara Desh from the movie Kallarali Hoovagi, Akash Audio 2006

Marathi film songs
 Songs Anandache Dohi and Deh Pandurang from the movie Pushpak Vimaan 2018
 'Dhyan Karu Jata' Abhang composed by Mahesh Mahadev in his new Raga Mukthipradayini, Written by Samarth Ramdas, Released by Audio Label  PM Audios in 2019

References

Dhyan Karu zata : https://music.apple.com/in/album/santanche-abhang-single/1485681835

About Rag Bhimsen: https://www.indiantalentmagazine.com/2019/02/05/mahesh-mahadev/

External links
Home Page

Year of birth missing (living people)
Living people
Hindustani singers
21st-century Indian male classical singers
Kirana gharana
People from Hubli
Singers from Karnataka